Bishop Derek Byrne S.P.S. (born 17 January 1948) is an Irish priest of the St. Patrick's Missionary Society (Kiltegan Fathers), currently Bishop of Primavera do Leste–Paranatinga, Brazil (25 June 2014 – present). Previously, Byrne served as Bishop of Guiratinga, Brazil (2008–2014). 

Born Derek John Christopher Byrne, he is from Monkstown, County Dublin. He attended Newbridge College.

He studied at University College Cork, earning a BA in Philosophy and Theological Studies in St. Patrick's College, Kiltegan, where he was ordained a priest in 1973. Following ordination, he went to Brazil, where he served until 1980. He worked in the US and Ireland in fundraising and leadership positions before going back to Brazil in 2003 as parish priest of Castanheira in the state of Mato Grosso.

See also
Catholic Church in Brazil

References

1948 births
20th-century Irish Roman Catholic priests
Christian clergy from Dublin (city)
Alumni of University College Cork
People educated at Newbridge College
Living people
21st-century Roman Catholic bishops in Brazil
Irish expatriate Catholic bishops
People from Monkstown, County Dublin
Roman Catholic bishops of Primavera do Leste–Paranatinga